This list contains the museums in Northamptonshire, England, defined as institutions (including nonprofit organizations, government entities, and private businesses) that collect and care for objects of cultural, artistic, scientific, or historical interest and make their collections or related exhibits available for public viewing. Also included are non-profit art galleries and university art galleries.  Museums that exist only in cyberspace (i.e. virtual museums) are not included.

See also
 :Category:Tourist attractions in Northamptonshire

References
 Northamptonshire Museums & Historic Houses

 
Northamptonshire
Museums